Gavan Kola (also Romanized as Gāvān Kolā; also known as Gāvzan Kolā) is a village in Gatab-e Jonubi Rural District, Gatab District, Babol County, Mazandaran Province, Iran. At the 2006 census, its population was 1,075, in 236 families.

References 

Populated places in Babol County